Albert Sheehan (8 November 1887 – 25 April 1954) was an Australian rules footballer who played for the Fitzroy Football Club in the Victorian Football League (VFL).

Notes

External links 

1887 births
1954 deaths
Australian rules footballers from New South Wales
Fitzroy Football Club players
People educated at Geelong College
Australian rules footballers from Melbourne